Juan Alcacer is a United States economist, currently the James J. Hill Professor of Business Administration at Harvard Business School.

References

Year of birth missing (living people)
Living people
Harvard Business School faculty
American economists
University of Michigan alumni